Christian Filippella is a producer, cinematographer and director, current member of the Producers Guild of America and the Television Academy (ATAS/NATAS).

Filippella began working as an independent filmmaker in Spain and Ireland. He was accepted to the directing program of the prestigious Centro Sperimentale di Cinematografia in Rome and was awarded his diploma in 2005 with his thesis film Thermae starring Claire Falconer and Carolina Crescentini. Subsequently, he was awarded a Fulbright Scholarship and completed MFA studies at the American Film Institute (AFI) in 2008.

Filippella also has received twice the Philip Morris Cinema Award and the Sergio Corbucci Prize in 2006.

His feature film Silver Case stars Academy Award Nominees Seymour Cassel and Eric Roberts in the lead role of the Senator, and features Shalim Ortiz, Chris Facey, Brian Keith Gamble, Vincent De Paul (actor), Fernanda Romero, Scarlett Chorvat and Claire Falconer.

Silver Case, which premiered at Rome International Film Festival, won 5 Indie Awards with Best of Show. The movie has been released worldwide.

The Los Angeles Times reviewed the film as "brisk, good-looking and never dull"

Mr Filippella has since then produced several feature films including A Place Called Hollywood, Beverly Hills Christmas I and This is Our Christmas starring Dean Cain, John Savage, Margaret O'Brien, and Ronn Moss.

In 2018 Filippella received the Halo Award and the Life Achievement Award from the Motion Picture Council in Hollywood.

Honors

 Deviate NIFC (2002)
 Philip Morris Cinema Award (2003)
 Philip Morris Cinema Award (2004)
 Fulbright Award (2006)
 Sergio Corbucci Prize (2006)
 Accolade Award - Film (2009)
 Spirit of Independent Award (2011)
 Merit Award - FLIFF (2011)
 Accolade Award - Directing (2012)
 Indie Award - Direction (2012)
 Indie Award - Best of Show (2012)
 Vegas Cine Fest - Best Feature First Runner Up (2012)
 Los Angeles Film & TV Festival - Best Director (2013)
 Los Angeles Film & TV Festival - Best Feature (2013)
 Life Achievement Award Motion Picture Council (2018)
 Halo Award - Best Feature Motion Picture Council (2018)

Film festivals official selection

 European Film Festival (2003)
 Instanbul International Film Festival (2004)
 RIFF (2005)
 European Film Festival (2006)
 LA Shorts Film Festival (2009)
 Screamfest (2009 and 2010)
 Daytona Beach Film Festival (2011)
 Bahamas International Film Festival (2011)
 Fort Lauderdale International Film Festival (2011)
 Cannes Film Festival (2011)
 Rome International Film Festival (2011)
 Cine Vegas Fest (2012)
 San Diego Black Film Festival (2012)
 Big Island International Film Festival (2012)
 Hoboken International Film Festival (2012)
 Fantafilmfestival (2012)
 Salento Int. Film Festival (2012)
 New Filmmaker Program (2012)
 Hoboken Int. Film Festival (2012)
 Los Angeles Film Festival (2012)
 Long Island Int. Film Festival (2013)

Filmography (director)
 Distretto di polizia - 2nd unit director (4 episodes, 2003)
 Silver Nail (2003)
 Il rigore più lungo del mondo (2004)
 Thermae (2006)
 Narcissus Dreams (2009)
 White Widow (2009)
 Swifty & Veg (2010)
 Tangled (2010)
 Silver Case (2012)
 Red Wine & Gold music video (2018)
 This is Our Christmas (2018)

Filmography (writer)
 Silver Nail (2003)
 Il rigore più lungo del mondo (2004)
 Thermae (2006)
 Narcissus Dreams (2009)
 White Widow (2009)
 Swifty & Veg (2010)
 Silver Case (2011)

Filmography (producer)
 Narcissus Dreams (2009)
 White Widow (2009)
 Swifty & Veg (2010)
 Tangled (2010)
 The Wishmakers (2011)
 Silver Case (2011)
 A Place Called Hollywood (2014)
 Beverly Hills Christmas (2015)
 This is Our Christmas (2018)
 Shepherd: The Story of Jewish Dog (2019)

Filmography (cinematograher)
 Silver Case (2011)
 Beverly Hills Christmas (2015)
 This is Our Christmas (2018)
 Magic Max (2019)

References

External links

Official Christian Filippella site

Italian film directors
1975 births
Living people
Centro Sperimentale di Cinematografia alumni